Fombio is a comune (municipality) in the Province of Lodi in the Italian region Lombardy, located about  southeast of Milan and about  southeast of Lodi.

It was the site of the Battle of Fombio in 1796.

Fombio borders the following municipalities: Codogno, Somaglia, San Fiorano, Santo Stefano Lodigiano, Guardamiglio, San Rocco al Porto.

See also
Retegno

References

External links

 Official website

Cities and towns in Lombardy